In Greek mythology, Abaris the Hyperborean ( Abaris Hyperboreios), son of Seuthes (Σεύθης), was a legendary sage, healer, and priest of Apollo known to the Ancient Greeks. He was supposed to have learned his skills in his homeland of Hyperborea, which he fled during a plague. He was said to be endowed with the gift of prophecy, and by this as well as by his Scythian dress, simplicity, and honesty he created great sensation in Greece, and was held in high esteem.

Legend
According to Herodotus, he was said to have traveled around the world with an arrow symbolizing Apollo, eating no food. Heraclides Ponticus (c. 390 BC–c. 310 BC) wrote that Abaris flew on it. Plato (Charmides 158C) classes him amongst the "Thracian physicians" who practice medicine upon the soul as well as the body by means of "incantations" (epodai). A temple to Persephone at Sparta was attributed to Abaris by Pausanias (9.10).  Alan H. Griffiths compares Abaris to Aristeas in terms of being a "shamanistic missionary and savior-figure" and notes Pindar places Abaris during the time of Croesus.

Phalaris
A particularly rich trove of anecdotes is found in Iamblichus's Vita Pythagorica. Here, Abaris is said to have purified Sparta and Knossos, among other cities, from plagues (VP 92–93). Abaris also appears in a climactic scene alongside Pythagoras at the court of the Sicilian tyrant Phalaris. The two sages discuss divine matters, and urge the obstinate tyrant towards virtue (ibid. 215–221). Iamblicus also attributes to Abaris a special expertise at extispicy, the art of divination through the examination of anomalies in the entrails of animals. The Suda attributes a number of books to Abaris, including a volume of Scythian Oracles in dactylic hexameter, a prose theogony, a poem on the marriage of the river Hebrus, a work on purifications, and an account of Apollo's visit to the Hyperboreans. But such works, if they were really current in ancient times, were no more genuine than his reputed correspondence with Phalaris the tyrant.

A more securely historical Greco-Scythian philosopher, who travelled among the Hellenes in the early sixth century, was Anacharsis.

Eighteenth century Bath architect John Wood, the Elder wrote about Abaris, and put forth the fanciful suggestion that he should be identified with King Bladud.

Modern impact
 A Senior Society at Dartmouth College is named Abaris after this figure; it is one of eight Senior Societies among Dartmouth College student groups.
 Abaris is featured in songs by the band Therion; "An Arrow From The Sun" (Lemuria), "The Wand of Abaris", and "The Falling Stone" (Gothic Kabbalah).
 Abaris is mentioned in Michael Moorcock's story "The Greater Conqueror".

Notes

Sources
Herodotus, The Histories with an English translation by A. D. Godley. Cambridge. Harvard University Press. 1920. Online version at the Perseus Digital Library.
Nonnus, Dionysiaca translated by William Henry Denham Rouse (1863-1950), from the Loeb Classical Library, Cambridge, MA, Harvard University Press, 1940.  Online version at the Topos Text Project.
Plato's Charmides in the most famous passage concerning .
Plato, Platonis Opera, ed. John Burnet. Oxford University Press. 1903.
Strabo, The Geography of Strabo. Edition by H.L. Jones. Cambridge, Mass.: Harvard University Press; London: William Heinemann, Ltd. 1924. Online version at the Perseus Digital Library.

Kingsley, Peter - A Story Waiting To Pierce You - Mongolia, Tibet And The Destiny Of The Western World, (The Golden Sufi Center, 2010) .

External links

Mythological Greek seers
Ancient Greek shamans
Hyperborea